Mostyn Hall is a large house standing in 25 acres (10 hectares) of garden near the village of Mostyn, Flintshire, Wales. It is designated by Cadw as a Grade I listed building.

History
It is not known for how long a building has been present on the site, but the great hall is thought to have been built by 1470. The house was substantially upgraded in 1631-2 by Roger and Mary Mostyn, descendants of Ieuan Fychan, whose grandson had adopted the Mostyn surname. 

Since 1660 the hall has been the seat of the Mostyn Baronets, and since 1831, of the barons Mostyn. In the 1840s the 1st Baron Mostyn commissioned architect Ambrose Poynter to remodel the house, which was carried out mainly in 1846–47 in a Jacobethan style inspired by the pre-existing building.

Porth Mawr is a former Tudor gatehouse block to the south west of the house which dates from 1570. Ornamental entrance gates leading to the house were designed in early 18th-century Baroque style by the Chester architect John Douglas and constructed by James Swindley in 1896. 

The hall is still in the hands of the Mostyn family. Since 2014 it has been open to the public on a limited number of days in the year.

Architecture and description

Listing designations
Mostyn Hall is listed Grade I, the highest grade, as is Porth Mawr. A number of barns and agricultural buildings on the Mostyn Estate are listed Grade II* including the dovecote and attached range, a barn to the north-east, another to the north-west, and a farm range to the south-west. A house, and weighbridge are listed at Grade II, as are John Douglas's gates. On the wider estate, listed structures include an icehouse, the walled garden, and a gamekeeper's cottage. At the estate's perimeter, a number of lodges and their associated gates and railings all have Grade II listings including Drybridge Lodge, Ivy House, Penlan Lodge, 
 and Seaview Lodge.The gardens are listed as Grade II* in the Cadw/ICOMOS Register of Parks and Gardens of Special Historic Interest in Wales.

Gallery

References

Sources

External links

 Official website

Houses completed in 1470
Houses completed in 1632
Grade I listed buildings in Flintshire
 Grade II* listed buildings in Flintshire
Houses in Flintshire
Grade I listed houses
John Douglas buildings
Country houses in Wales
Registered historic parks and gardens in Flintshire